The 2007 Havant Borough Council election took place on 3 May 2007 to elect members of Havant Borough Council in Hampshire, England. One third of the council was up for election and the Conservative Party stayed in overall control of the council.

After the election, the composition of the council was:
Conservative 31
Labour 4
Liberal Democrats 3

Background
Before the election the Conservatives had 30 councillors, while both the Labour party and the Liberal Democrats had 4 seats. There was no election in the 4 Leigh Park wards in 2007 and as a result Labour was not defending any of their 4 seats on the council, while the Conservatives were defending 8 of the 10 seats that were contested.

Election result
The Conservatives won 9 of the 10 seats contested, taking 1 seat from the Liberal Democrats. This took the Conservatives to 31 seats on the council, which the Conservative council leader David Gillett said he believed was "the largest Conservative majority on the south coast". The only seat not won by the Conservatives was in Bedhampton where the Liberal Democrats held on by a majority of 319 votes. Overall turnout at the elections was 35.2%.

Ward results

Bedhampton

Cowplain

Emsworth

Hart Plain

Hayling East

Hayling West

Purbrook

St Faiths

Stakes

Waterloo

References

2007 English local elections
Havant Borough Council elections
2000s in Hampshire